Ralph Roister Doister is a sixteenth-century play by Nicholas Udall, which was once regarded as the first comedy to be written in the English language.

The date of its composition is disputed, but the balance of opinion suggests that it was written in about 1552, when Udall was a schoolmaster in London, and some theorise the play was intended for public performance by his pupils—who were all male, as were most actors in that period. The work was not published until 1567, 11 years after its author's death.

Sources
Roister Doister seems to have been inspired by the works of Plautus and Terence. The title character is a variation on the "Braggart Soldier" archetype, but with the innovation of a parasitic tempter which stems from the morality play tradition. By combining the structures, conventions, and styles of the ancient Greek and Roman comedies with English theatrical traditions and social types (especially the relatively new and burgeoning English middle classes), Udall was able to establish a new form of English comedy, leading directly through to Shakespeare and beyond. The play blends the stock plot-elements and stock characters of the ancient Greek and Roman theatre with those of chivalric literature and the English mediaeval theatre.

Plot
The play is written in five acts. The plot of the play centres on a rich widow, Christian Custance, who is betrothed to Gawyn Goodluck, a merchant. Ralph Roister Doister is encouraged throughout by a con-man trickster figure (Matthew Merrygreeke) to woo Christian Custance, but his pompous attempts do not succeed. Ralph then tries with his friends and servants (at Merrygreek's behest) to break in and take Christian Custance by force, but they are defeated by her maids and run away. The merchant Gawyn arrives shortly after and the play concludes happily with reconciliation, a prayer and a song.

Characters
Ralph Roister Doister
Mathew Merygreeke
Gawyn Goodluck, affianced to Dame Custance
Tristram Trustie, his friend
Dobinet Doughtie, servant to Roister Doister
Tom Trupenie, servant to Dame Custance
Sym Suresby, servant to Goodluck
Scrivener
Harpax, servant to Roister Doister
Dame Christian Custance, a widow
Margerie Mumblecrust, her nurse
Tibet Talkapace, her maid
Annot Alyface, her maid

Performance history
A generally accepted theory is that Udall first wrote the play for public performance by boys at the London school where he was master, though no recorded historical afterlife for the play in performance exists. Though amateur and student groups have presented readings and edited stagings sporadically throughout the 20th century (specifically a 1910 production by the Philolexian Society of Columbia University and a 1953 presentation by Oxford University students at the Edinburgh festival), and three heavily edited adaptations of the play appeared (in the 1930s, 1960s, and 1980s), it did not have a full professional revival until 2015, when Brice Stratford directed an uncut production under original performance conditions for the Owle Schreame theatre company, also playing the title character.

References

Sources
 Chislett, William, Jr. 1914. "The Sources of Ralph Roister Doister." Modern Language Notes 29:6 (June): 166-167.
 Hartley, Anthony. 1954. The Spectator Performing Arts section, 3 September 1954: 10. Web. 
 Hinton, James. 1913. "The Source of Ralph Roister Doister." Modern Philology 11:2 (Oct.): 273-278.
 Norland, Howard B. 1995. Drama in Early Tudor Britain, 1485-1558. Lincoln: University of Nebraska Press.
 O'Brien, Angela. 2004. Ralph Roister Doister: The First Regular English Comedy.
 Partridge, Matthew. 2015. "Review: Ralph Roister Doister." Remotegoat, 25 February 2015. Web. Review: Ralph Roister Doister ****
 Plumstead, A. W. 1963. "Satirical Parody in Roister Doister: A Reinterpretation." Studies in Philology 60:2 (April): 141-154.
 Wickham, Glynne, ed. 1976. English Moral Interludes. London: Dent. .
 Wickham, Glynne. 1981. Early English Stages: 1300—1660. Vol. 3. London: Routledge. .

External links
Ralph Roister Doister online (Project Gutenberg)
Ralph Roister Doister in A Selection of Old English Plays, edited by W. Carew Hazlitt (Project Gutenberg)

English Renaissance plays
1553 plays